Drosera prolifera is a species of Drosera found in Queensland, Australia.

See also
List of Drosera species

References

External links

Carnivorous plants of Australia
Caryophyllales of Australia
prolifera
Flora of Queensland
Plants described in 1940
Vulnerable flora of Australia